Harry Gold (26 February 1907 – 13 November 2005), born Hyman Goldberg, was an English British Dixieland jazz saxophonist and bandleader.

Biography
The eldest of six children, born to a Romanian mother, Hetty Schulman, and a Polish father, Sam Goldberg, Gold's career spanned almost the whole history of jazz in Britain in the 20th century. Born in Leytonstone, London, in 1907 and raised in the East End of London, he decided on a career in music after his father took him to see the Original Dixieland Jazz Band playing at the Hammersmith Palais during their famous visit to Britain in 1919–1920. He studied saxophone, clarinet, oboe and music theory under Louis Kimmel, a professor at the London College of Music, and began working professionally as a musician in the early 1920s. He played with the Metronomes, Vic Filmer, Geraldo, Ambrose and many other bands, but it was his tenure as a star tenor saxophonist with the nationally popular dance band of Roy Fox from 1932 to 1937 that brought him to wide public attention.

Playing plush London venues such as the Cafe Anglais and the Café de Paris, he watched, from the bandstand, the London nobility of the inter-war years – including the Prince of Wales – enjoying the high life. However, the contrasts in wealth and poverty that he saw reinforced his socialist convictions. From that time and through most of the rest of his career he was active in union activities and in efforts to promote the welfare of other musicians.

Pieces of Eight
In 1937, while working with Oscar Rabin, he formed a band within the Rabin orchestra, performing "break sets" as "The Pieces of Eight"; this continued throughout World War II, dodging bombs during the London Blitz and across the country. After the war, thanks to radio broadcasts, records and incessant touring, Harry Gold and his Pieces of Eight became household names in Britain through the late 1940s and 1950s.

In December 1945, Harry Gold and his Pieces of Eight recorded for the first time, and began regularly appearing on the BBC's “Music While You Work” radio show.

In 1946, the group almost became one of the first British bands to perform on television, but their performance was not broadcast because Gold's black singer and trombonist, Geoff Love, sang a duet with the band's female white singer, Jane Lee. However, a performance at the 1947 Jazz Jamboree launched the Pieces of Eight to belated national prominence, and, in 1948, Harry Gold and his Pieces of Eight accompanied the singer and composer Hoagy Carmichael on a well-received tour of the UK.

Eventually, however, tired of touring, Gold handed over the band to his brother Laurie on New Year's Eve 1955 and opted for a quieter life as a composer-arranger, working for music publishers and later for the EMI organisation. But he continued to play, joining Dick Sudhalter's New Paul Whiteman Orchestra in London in the 1970s and eventually reforming his Pieces of Eight. The band was inspired by the Bob Crosby Bobcats and Laurie Gold by Eddie Miller.

In the 1980s the band toured East Germany three times and recorded a live album in Leipzig (reissued on CD). He had two children by his first wife Annie (Morton and Leslie) and two more (David and Andrew) by his second wife Peggy. After Peggy died in 1995, Gold carried on working and, in his late 80s and early 90s, he still played occasionally, especially at the annual Clerkenwell Festivals in London, several North Sea Jazz Festivals, and those in Cork (Ireland): he also "guested" with other bands and travelled to the USA to perform. Although by then he had long given up the tenor saxophone, he continued to feature the bass saxophone on which, over the years (and influenced by the style of Adrian Rollini) he had become one of its most graceful and melodic exponents. Although he left an extensive back catalogue of recordings on 78 rpm discs, he did not make many records later in life.

Some long-time fans and former band members say the reformed band was not as good as the original although some performances, especially those where the front line was driven by the Bix-like trumpet of Al Wynette, were memorable. Fortunately, some of these were broadcast and exist on tape. In 2000, he published his autobiography, Gold, Doubloons and Pieces of Eight, recalling eight decades as a working musician, and some of his original compositions and arrangements are published and still available.

References

Further reading
 
 

1907 births
2005 deaths
20th-century saxophonists
20th-century British male musicians
English jazz bandleaders
English jazz saxophonists
British male saxophonists
British people of Romanian descent
British people of German descent
People from Leytonstone
Dixieland bandleaders
Dixieland saxophonists
British male jazz musicians
British socialists
Jewish British musicians